The Central Arkansas Bears basketball statistical leaders are individual statistical leaders of the Central Arkansas Bears basketball program in various categories, including points, rebounds, assists, steals, and blocks. Within those areas, the lists identify single-game, single-season, and career leaders. The Bears represent the University of Central Arkansas (UCA) in men's basketball as members of the NCAA Division I ASUN Conference.

Central Arkansas began competing in intercollegiate basketball in 1920. It initially played in Amateur Athletic Union (AAU)-sponsored competitions, and later in the National Association of Intercollegiate Athletics (NAIA). UCA did not join the NCAA until 1993, playing in Division II until moving to Division I in 2006. This history is significant because the official recording of statistics began at different times in different organizations, as well as different NCAA divisions. The NAIA record books do not indicate when the organization began officially recording statistics on a national basis, but its current records (as of 2020–21) for single-game and single-season assists were both set in 1972–73, and the career record for blocks dates to 1975. By the time UCA joined the NCAA, that body had begun recording all major statistics on a national basis.

The UCA record books include players in all named statistics, regardless of whether they were officially recorded by any of the governing bodies in which the school was a member. These lists are updated through the end of the 2020–21 season.

Scoring

Rebounds

Assists

Steals

Blocks

Footnotes

References

Lists of college basketball statistical leaders by team
Statistical